James or Jim Yarbrough may refer to: 
 James C. Yarbrough, United States Army general
 Jim Yarbrough (offensive lineman) (James Kelley Yarbrough, born 1946), American football player
 Jim Yarbrough (defensive back) (James Edward Yarbrough, born 1963), American football player
 Jim Yarbrough (basketball) (born 1964), American college basketball coach